The Aveto Natural Regional Park is a natural park in Metropolitan City of Genoa, in the Liguria region of northern Italy). It was established in 1995.

Geography 
Situated in the inland of the Tigullio area, Aveto Natural Regional Park protects one of the most beautiful and important areas of the Ligurian Apennines mountain range.

 high-mountain landscapes, grazing lands and large beech tree woods in Aveto Valley (Rezzoaglio, Santo Stefano d'Aveto); 
 meadows where cattle graze, chestnut tree and hazelnut tree woods, vegetable gardens and olive groves in Sturla Valley; 
 a well-preserved rural landscape with olive groves and vineyards, a great variety of rocks and minerals and therefore quarries and mines in Graveglia Valley.

The Lame lakes create perfect wet habitats for a very special small and rare Italian mushroom, the Calocybe gambosa, better known as dogfish.

External links 
 Pages by the Park Authority on Parks.it
 Val d'Aveto

Parks in Liguria
Metropolitan City of Genoa
Regional parks of Italy
Protected areas of the Apennines
Protected areas established in 1995
1995 establishments in Italy